Sa'gya County is a county under the prefecture-level city of Xigazê in the Tibet Autonomous Region.

The county is named after Sakya Monastery, home of the Sakya school of Tibetan Buddhism.

Towns and townships 
 Sa'gya Town 
 Gêding Town
 Xungmai Township 
 Maja Township
 Zhungma Township
 Tashigang Township
 Chagjug Township
 Së Township
 Lalho Township
 Drag'rong Township
 Molha Township

Counties of Tibet
Shigatse